In human anatomy, the superior mesenteric vein (SMV) is a blood vessel that drains blood from the small intestine (jejunum and ileum). Behind the neck of the pancreas, the superior mesenteric vein combines with the splenic vein to form the portal vein that carries blood to the liver. The superior mesenteric vein lies to the right of the similarly named artery, the superior mesenteric artery, which originates from the abdominal aorta.

Structure 
Tributaries of the superior mesenteric vein drain the small intestine, large intestine, stomach, pancreas and appendix and include:
 Right gastro-omental vein (also known as the right gastro-epiploic vein)
 inferior pancreaticoduodenal veins
 veins from jejunum
 veins from ileum
 middle colic vein – drains the transverse colon
 right colic vein – drains the ascending colon
 ileocolic vein
The superior mesenteric vein combines with the splenic vein to form the portal vein.

Clinical significance
Thrombosis of the superior mesenteric vein is quite rare, but a significant cause of mesenteric ischemia and can be fatal. It is estimated that 10–15% of mesenteric ischemia is due to mesenteric thrombosis.

References

Additional images

External links
 
  – "Intestines and Pancreas: The Superior Mesenteric Vessels"
 

Veins of the torso